Hypleurochilus fissicornis is a species of combtooth blenny found in the Azores and southwest Atlantic ocean off eastern South America from Paraíba to Uruguay.

References

fissicornis
Fish described in 1824